Tampa Catholic High School is a diocesan, Catholic, coeducational high school  located in Tampa, Florida, United States, founded in 1962. It is in the Roman Catholic Diocese of Saint Petersburg. Its motto is "Veritas et Caritas," which means "Truth and Charity."

Description
The Diocese of St. Augustine opened Tampa Catholic High School on September 4, 1962, to serve the needs of Catholic education for the parish families of Hillsborough County. The school was guided through its early years by Monsignor John F. Scully, the founding President, and was staffed by diocesan priests, the Dominican Sisters of Adrian, Michigan and dedicated lay personnel. The school opened with one classroom building and a convent.

After spending one year in temporary quarters at Christ the King parish, 230 9th and 10th grade students made their way to the new Tampa Catholic campus. TC was initially planned to house a girls' division to be known as Lourdes Academy; the boys' division was to be located elsewhere in Tampa. The plan was changed to provide a coeducational facility, taking into account the already operating Academy of the Holy Names and Jesuit High School. The campus consisted of only the South and Center buildings, with the library, chapel and administration located in the Center building. The early classes were held in eight classrooms with a chemistry-physics-biology laboratory, a home economics room, a library, and an administration area.
 
In 1964 the first class of seniors was enrolled and the multi-purpose building (now the cafeteria) was completed. In 1965 Tampa Catholic graduated its first class, numbering 51. This was also the first year TC had a full squad for a football team, playing a schedule of both JV and varsity games.  The school mascot at the time was known as the Tampa Catholic Colts.
 
For the 1965–66 school year Tampa Catholic changed its colors to green and white and its mascot to the Crusaders. That same year TC played its first homecoming game against Admiral Farragut Academy.
 
In 1968, Tampa Catholic became fully accredited by the Southern Association of Colleges and Schools and saw the completion of the north building, chapel, gym, track and baseball diamond, all of which were dedicated by Bishop Charles McLaughlin, of the newly founded Diocese of St. Petersburg.
 
In the early 1970s the Assumptionist Brothers and the Sisters of Ste-Chrétienne assumed administrative and teaching duties. The administration building and the library complex were completed in 1972.  These early years of the 1970s saw Tampa Catholic's enrollment rocket to nearly 1500 students. This was more than the buildings could accommodate so the school was separated into two campuses for three years. The 9th grade students attended the "East Campus" located on the grounds of Mary Help of Christians School, and additional portables were brought onto the TC campus to help house upperclassmen.
 
In late 1979 the leadership changed once again with the appointment of Br. Jude Byrne, of the Franciscan Brothers Community taking over as principal. Following several changes in administration, stability was once again gained by the 1984 appointment of Br. John Casey of the Congregation of Christian Brothers. By this time Tampa Catholic High School had grown to a nine-building campus stretching over 40 acres.
 
During the 1983–84 school year, TC entered into the tech era by installing the first computers on campus. They were used to teach students in computer programming classes.
 
In celebration of Tampa Catholic's 25th anniversary the school adopted a new coat of arms derived from models and sketches submitted by faculty and students. This coat of arms evokes the history of Tampa Catholic and includes the crest used by the Diocese of St. Petersburg.
 
Over the next 15 years Tampa Catholic saw additional improvements, including the installation of a school-wide air conditioning system, renovations of the three classroom buildings and upgrades in technology.
 
In 1997, after many years of effort from the alumni, parents, staff and general TC supporters, the Tampa City Council was persuaded to alter its zoning so that Tampa Catholic could move forward with plans to build a stadium and upgrade the athletic portion of the campus.
 
Even with the approval of the City Council, the stadium project was postponed for the greater good of the educational institution, and in 2002 efforts moved forward to establish a master plan for the 40-year-old school. This plan called for needed upgrades to the academic portion of the campus. Ground was broken that same year. In 2003 these improvements were completed, including the Archbishop Joseph P. Hurley Science & Technology Center and the Blessed Edmund Rice Chapel. Bishop Robert N. Lynch dedicated both buildings on August 27, 2003.
 
With the new academic facilities in place it was time to address renovations and improvements for the eastern part of the TC campus. These improvements were funded by the "Come Home To Rome" campaign, which started that same year.
 
Tampa Catholic celebrated a true homecoming when the 2005 homecoming football game drew over 3,000 students and alumni to the newly constructed football stadium. Additional improvements are planned for the athletic area.

In 2019, Tampa Catholic and alumni, Arnie Bellini – former CEO of ConnectWise – donated seven million USD to Tampa Catholic High School, as the first part of a US$70 million donation to the Tampa Bay area. Tampa Catholic High School is planning the construction of five projects that support the innovation and modernization of programs around the arts, sciences, technology, and physical fitness.

Athletics

Baseball
Tampa Catholic has a long tradition of baseball. They have won nine state championships in their history ('68, '71, '73, '74, '76, '79, '82, '96, '01).  Tampa Catholic's latest title came in 2009, as the Crusaders won the district 3A-11 title. Tampa Catholic is currently coached by Ty Griffin. Their baseball program has produced many top players, such as Denard Span (Tampa Bay Ray)), Kenny Kelly (Tampa Bay Rays and other teams) and Charles Cleveland (Florida State University). TC has retired the number 19 in baseball.

Cross Country

Tampa Catholic has a boys and a girls cross country team.
At the start of the 2021–2022 school year, Coach Phillip Robbins became the coach of the Cross Country Team. Preceding him was Coach Adriane Wunderlich.

Football

The Tampa Catholic men's football team plays in the fall semester.

Rowing

Tampa Catholic Crew is a co-ed sport that competes against other high school and youth rowing teams.  The team began in the 1999–2000 school year. The program has grown each year, adding boats, training equipment, and soon a new boat house.

At the Southeast Regional Championship Regatta held May 9-10th 2009 in Oak Ridge, Tennessee, the girls' novice four captured a silver medal. In the qualifying heat, the girls rowed the 2000 meter course in a time of 7 minutes 56 seconds, which was fast enough to capture both second place and a spot in the finals.  In the finals the girls again took second place.

In 2009 and 2010, the women's lightweight double, with Caitlin Mooney and Gabriella Gonzalez, qualified for and attended Scholastic Nationals in Camden, New Jersey (2009) and Saratoga, New York (2010).

In 2011, the men's varsity 4+ placed 6th scholastically at the Florida State Championship Regatta. They then qualified and attended Scholastic Nationals in Camden, New Jersey.

Volleyball
The Tampa Catholic Women's Volleyball Team plays during the fall semester.

Controversies

In January 2014, Tampa Catholic was the subject of illegal recruiting allegations when sophomore football player Nate Craig transferred from Pasco High School. One day after Craig began classes, Pasco football coach Tom McHugh alleged in an email to the FHSAA that Craig had "told him a Hillsborough County coach had asked him and his mother to change schools because he 'would fit perfectly into their team.'" Craig's mother responded that her had son transferred for "academic reasons."

Soon after, Sunlake High School also accused Tampa Catholic of recruiting after two of its players allegedly approached and told Sunlake officials that Crusaders coaches had asked them about transferring. The players also stated that a Tampa Catholic coach had come to their homes with scholarship offers, and said they would have better scholarship opportunities by leaving Pasco County.

In March 2015, the investigation ended after the FHSAA found insufficient evidence to support the claims.

In June 2019, a custodian at Tampa Catholic was arrested on charges of sexually abusing a student.

List of presidents and principals

Notable alumni
Johni Broome, college basketball player for the Auburn Tigers
 Nardi Contreras, former professional baseball player (Chicago White Sox)
 Joanna Garcia, actress
 Chaz Green, current NFL offensive tackle for the Dallas Cowboys
 Chuck Hernandez, current Miami Marlins pitching coach
 Darrell Jackson, former NFL wide receiver
 Kenny Kelly, former University of Miami quarterback; former professional baseball player (Tampa Bay Devil Rays, Seattle Mariners, New York Mets, Cincinnati Reds, Washington Nationals, Chicago White Sox)
 Kevin Knox, professional basketball player for the Portland Trail Blazers 
 Julie Elizabeth Leto, author
 Tino Martinez, former New York Yankees first baseman; played for MLB (1990–2005)
 Lance McCullers, former professional baseball player (San Diego Padres, New York Yankees, Detroit Tigers, Texas Rangers)
 Joe Molloy, former Yankees managing partner
 Rich Monteleone, former professional baseball player (Seattle Mariners, California Angels, New York Yankees, San Francisco Giants)
 Carlos Reyes, former professional baseball player (Oakland Athletics, San Diego Padres, Boston Red Sox, Philadelphia Phillies, Tampa Bay Rays)
 Donnie Scott, former professional baseball player (Texas Rangers, Seattle Mariners, Cincinnati Reds) 
 Seminole Heights serial killer (Howell Emanuel "Trai" Donaldson, III) 
 Manny Seoane,  former professional baseball player (Philadelphia Phillies, Chicago Cubs)
 Gayle Sierens, news anchor for Tampa NBC affiliate WFLA-TV
 Denard Span, outfielder for the Tampa Bay Rays (formerly played with the Minnesota Twins, Washington Nationals, and San Francisco Giants)
 John Tamargo, former professional baseball player (St. Louis Cardinals, San Francisco Giants, Montreal Expos)
 Channing Tatum, actor

References

External links

 School website

Congregation of Christian Brothers secondary schools
Catholic secondary schools in Florida
Educational institutions established in 1962
High schools in Tampa, Florida
Roman Catholic Diocese of Saint Petersburg
1962 establishments in Florida